= Stroszek (band) =

Scottish band

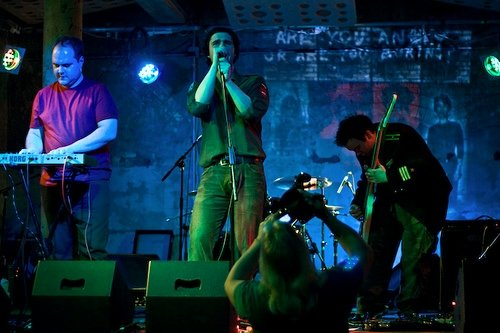
- Stroszek playing at Threads of Sound gig at Stereo in Glasgow in 2008

Background information
- Origin: Aberdeen, Glasgow, Scotland
- Genres: Alternative rock, post-punk, electronic
- Years active: 2005–2014
- Labels: Fire Exit
- Past members: Richey James Roberto; Leslie Wilcox; Douglas Danielio
- Website: myspace.com/stroszek

Stroszek were a post-punk/new wave/electronic band from Aberdeen, Scotland (later based in Glasgow). They comprised Richey James Roberto (voice, synth), Leslie Wilcox (guitar, synth, flute, programming), and Douglas Danielio (bass, synth, violin).

They released three EPs and a live single; Demo EP (2005), Demonstration EP (2007, self-produced), Manufacturing Consent EP (2008, Fire Exit Records), and Live in Stereo (2008, Threads of Sound). Artrocker described the band as "having fused the power of [The Clash and Joy Division] into an ambitious, inspiring art and aesthetic". The Skinny commented on the band's "mid-80s" sound on their Manufacturing Consent EP. SIC Magazine commented "no disrespect to the Manics but I think there is more to Stroszek than mere sloganeering"."Doug Daniel’s 'wrought iron’ basslines must be the safest place in the world for a sensitive soul to hide while Les Willox’s minimalist guitar licks are borderline erotic. Stroszek repeatedly remind us of the difference between good lyrics and obvious lyrics."

The band split up in 2014.

== Discography ==
- Demo EP (2005)
- Demonstration EP (2007)
- Manufacturing Consent EP (2008), Fire Exit Records
- Live in Stereo (2009), Threads of Sound
